Udayagiri Assembly constituency is a constituency of the Andhra Pradesh Legislative Assembly in India. Mekapati Chandra Sekhar Reddy of Yuvajana Sramika Rythu Congress Party is currently representing the constituency in Andhra Pradesh Legislative Assembly. This constituency was also represented by the incumbent Vice President of India, Venkaiah Naidu from 1978 to 1988.

Still drinking water is not available in Kondapuram mandal and no roads from few of villages till now.

Overview
It is part of the Nellore Lok Sabha constituency along with another six Vidhan Sabha segments, namely, Kandukur in Prakasam district, Kavali, Kovuru, Nellore City, Nellore Rural and Atmakur in Nellore district.

Mandal 
There are Eight Mandals.

Members of Legislative assembly

Election results

Assembly elections 2019

Assembly elections 2014

Assembly Elections 2009

Assembly Elections 2004

Assembly Elections 1999

Assembly elections 1994

Assembly elections 1989

Assembly elections 1985

Assembly elections 1983

Assembly elections 1978

Assembly elections 1972

Assembly elections 1967

Assembly elections 1962

Assembly elections 1955

Assembly elections 1952

See also

 List of constituencies of Andhra Pradesh Vidhan Sabha

References

Assembly constituencies of Andhra Pradesh